Pagan Lorn was a heavy metal band in Luxembourg from 1994 until 1998, the band is regarded to have been among those bands that sparked the metal and underground music scene in Luxembourg in the late 1990s.

Pagan Lorn was founded in mid-1994. In 1995 Stephen Misquita and Jos F. Kirps joined the band as two members were replaced. Pagan Lorn was then Sascha Georges (vocals), Patrick Hurt (keyboards), Jos F. Kirps (guitars), Vladeta Maksimovic (bass), Stephen Misquita (drums) and Patrick Linnig (promotion).

A first demo tape was recorded at the end of 1995. In 1996 Pagan Lorn recorded and released their first CD Black Wedding at Linster Studios in Frisange, Luxembourg. The artwork was provided by Patricia Lippert, who was one of Luxembourg's most notable artists of the time. Death metal band Desdemonia opened for Pagan Lorn at the CD release party that took place at Den Atelier in Luxembourg city. A second CD (Nihilennium) was recorded in 1997 and released in February 1998.

In mid-1998 Steve Legil joined as the second guitarist. During the second half of 1998 Pagan Lorn began to split. Jos F. Kirps left in October, while Patrick Linnig and Vladeta Maksimovic quit somewhat later. Jos F. Kirps was replaced by Alain Gonniva, while Vladeta Maksimovic rejoined Pagan Lorn in early 1999. In September 1999 Patrick Hurt left, and in January 2000 the band broke up.

In the final days of Pagan Lorn's existence, the heavy metal and underground scene in Luxembourg started to gain traction, and has become an important part of the country's music scene.

Since 2003 Jos F. Kirps is running a Pagan Lorn tribute website where all tracks from the demo tape and the CDs can be downloaded in MP3 format. Former singer Sascha Georges joined RTL Télé Lëtzebuerg and has since become one of the most popular TV news presenters in Luxembourg.

Discography
Black Wedding (1996)
"Absent Minded"
"Unleash"
"Artless Treatment"
"The Eternal"
"Confidence In The Executioner"
"Production"
"Epitome"

Nihilennium (1998)
"Outrage"
"Silence For A Day"
"Prone"
"Freezing Lust"
"Collapsed"
"You Vs You"
"Impose"
"Gone ..."
"... And Forgotten"
"Unborn" (hidden track)

References

External links
official website, maintained by former guitarist Jos Kirps
artist Patricia Lippert, who supported the band in its early days
Desdemonia, Luxembourg's most popular death metal band, played their first gig at Pagan Lorn's CD release

Luxembourgian musical groups
Doom metal musical groups
Musical groups established in 1994
Musical groups disestablished in 1998